Phostria umbrina is a moth in the family Crambidae. It was described by Jean Ghesquière in 1942. It is found in the former provinces of Équateur, Orientale and Kasai-Oriental in the Democratic Republic of the Congo.

References

Phostria
Moths described in 1942
Moths of Africa